South Midway Island is one of the uninhabited Canadian arctic islands in Kivalliq Region, Nunavut, Canada. It is irregularly shaped and is located within Chesterfield Inlet.

References

Islands of Chesterfield Inlet
Uninhabited islands of Kivalliq Region